Valeria Kurylskaya (born February 26, 1988) is a rhythmic gymnast who represented Belarus at both the 2003 and 2005 World Rhythmic Gymnastics Championships.

References

External links
 

1988 births
Living people
Belarusian rhythmic gymnasts
Medalists at the Rhythmic Gymnastics World Championships
Medalists at the Rhythmic Gymnastics European Championships
Gymnasts from Minsk